Goaribari is an island in southern Papua New Guinea. It is located in Gulf Province within the Gulf of Papua. During high tides, parts of the island are inundated. The vegetation is thick rainforest.

Headhunting was evidenced by the discovery of thousands of skulls in village houses and the longhouse in the early 20th century. In 1901, two ministers and ten missionary students were murdered and cannibalized by island natives.

Geography
The island is covered with tall mangroves.

The island is a formation at the delta of the Kikori and Omati Rivers. During very high tides (king tides during storm events), parts of the island become inundated. This has caused some deltaic villages to be relocated to higher ground.

History

On 8 April 1901, the Revs. James Chalmers and Oliver Fellows Tomkins (1873–1901), together with ten missionary students, were murdered with stone implements and cannibalized by the natives of this island, at Dopima village when they tried to preach to the natives and convert them; their bones were hung as trophies.

Following the massacre of the white missionaries, an Australian Royal Commission was called in 1904 to inquire into the scandal. This mission was led by Judge Christopher Stansfield Robinson. The object was to apprehend a native called Lake who was allegedly involved in the murders and who had refused to return the mortal remains of the missionaries for a Christian burial.

The mission also wanted to train a few natives as a police force to serve the island. A clash ensued between the natives who stormed the Australian ship Merrie England. The clash was implemented without forethought, turning violent. Guns were used on the natives. As many as eight were killed and many were injured. There were no major injuries to the Australians.

During this reprisal raid, missionary Rev. Harry Moore Dauncey reported that between 4 and 700 skulls were found in various village houses, and nearly 10,000 skulls were counted in the longhouse and burnt during this raid. The mission considered the natives to be savages as they greased their body for cover instead of wearing clothing. Professor Matthew R. Keller believes the commission viewed the population of the island as a different biological species. As a consequence of the villagers' massacre, Robinson shot himself and was replaced as Chief Judicial Officer by Hubert Murray.

1924 floods 
In 1924, floods and erosion of large tracts of coastal land resulted in the people of Kirawa village abandoning their homes and shifting to other villages in the Goaribari district. As a result, there are only two villages that remain on the island – Goare in the west (pop. 38) and Dopima in the east (pop. 62), which are also subject to frequent flooding. Some archaeological remains of Otoia village remain, while parts have been eroded by the Kikori River's delta channel. Pile dwellings are common as most of the land is barely above high water (of spring tides) which makes most of the island almost uninhabitable.

Culture
The Kerewo people live in the northwestern region of the island. The language spoken by the people is linked to Kiwai. Their ethnic identity is similar to those of the Fly River delta. Men have worn pubic protection crafted from a Melo shell.

The Muguru ceremony that natives of the island conduct is similar to the one held by Kiwai people which is conducted at the club house decorated by dracaena leaves and a dracaena branch is stuck into the waist bands of the novices. When a skull is captured then also the dracaena is hung on the club house. On the top of the hill growth of crotons is noted.

Flora
The wildlife is dominated by a tropical wet rainforest. Flora includes Nipa and coconut palms.

Governance 
Goaribari is part of West Kikori Rural LLG (Local Level Government) Area in Kikori District of Gulf Province.

See also
 List of islands of Papua New Guinea

References

Bibliography

Islands of Papua New Guinea
Headhunting in New Guinea
Cannibalism in Oceania
Gulf Province